The governor of Ilocos Sur, is the chief executive of the provincial government of Ilocos Sur.

List of governors of Ilocos Sur

References

Governors of Ilocos Sur
Ilocos Sur